Down to Earth is the second studio album by Welsh musician Jem, the follow-up to Finally Woken.  The first single, "It's Amazing", was featured on the soundtrack to the Sex and the City movie. The album spawned four singles.

The press release states that Jem co-wrote the album with a variety of people including Jeff Bass, Lester Mendez and Greg Kurstin and sings in Japanese on the track, "Aciiid!". The album also includes a collaboration with South African singer-songwriter and poet-activist Vusi Mahlasela on the track "You Will Make It" which was dedicated to the memory of D12 member Proof. Although the collaboration never happened, Jem wanted to work with Eminem for the song, saying "The track is about losing someone and I wrote it the day after his friend Proof was murdered. I was in Detroit with Eminem's friends, who I happened to be recording with, when it happened".

Critical reception
Down to Earth was met with "mixed or average" reviews from critics. At Metacritic, which assigns a weighted average rating out of 100 to reviews from mainstream publications, this release received an average score of 54 based on 7 reviews.

In a review for AllMusic, critic reviewer Andrew Leahey wrote: "Down to Earth's title depicts Jem as a grounded musician, but its wide-ranging sound suggests something different, as the singer has yet to find a style that fully suits her capabilities."

Track listing

Personnel 

Hiroko Aoyagi – vocals
Jeff Atmajian – piano, string arrangements, piano arrangement
Jeff Bass – bass, guitar, keyboards, producer, drum programming, tracked by
Kevin Beber – drum programming
Brian Berryman – engineer, fader engineer
Mick Bolger – trombone, trumpet, euphonium, mellophonium, E flat cornet
Mike Bradford – producer, string arrangements, instrumentation
Del Casher – sounds
Bryan Cook – engineer
Nick Cuchinella – trombone
Nabil Elderkin – photography
Johnny Evans – saxophone
Serban Ghenea – mixing
Jem Griffiths – vocals, producer, vocal engineer, poetry reading
Justin Griffiths – acoustic guitar
John Hanes – mixing
Mark Aaron James – design
Ted Jensen – mastering
Shinobu Lee – vocals
David Levita – acoustic guitar, guitar
Lester Mendez – piano, producer, string arrangements, brass arrangement, instrumentation
Monica Mendez – sound design
Milan, Derrick & The Krew – chorus
Eddie Miller – vocal engineer
Rafael Padilla – percussion
Phillip Ramos – studio assistant
Tim Roberts – mixing assistant
Ken Robinson – trumpet
Sonus – strings
Welsh Choir of Southern California – chorus
Joe Wohlmuth – engineer

Charts

Release history

Notes

References

2008 albums
Albums produced by Greg Kurstin
Albums produced by Michael Bradford
ATO Records albums
Jem (singer) albums